Shahrak-e Azadi (also Romanized as Shahraḵ-e Āzādī) is a village in Jahad Rural District, Hamidiyeh District, Ahvaz County, Khuzestan Province, Iran. At the 2006 census, its population was 100, in 14 families.

References 

Populated places in Ahvaz County